Cian O'Dwyer is an Irish hurler who plays club hurling for Clonakenny and at inter-county level with the Tipperary senior hurling team.

Career
On 4 February 2023, he made his league debut for Tipperary in the opening round of the 2023 National Hurling League against Laois, scoring two points as Tipperary won by 2–32 to 0–18.

References

Tipperary inter-county hurlers

Living people

Year of birth missing (living people)